Cartas de amor, is a Mexican telenovela that aired on  Canal 4, Telesistema Mexicano in 1960. Produced by Ernesto Alonso and starring Angélica María and Ernesto Alonso.

Cast 
 Ernesto Alonso
 Angélica María
 Sergio Bustamante

Production 
Original Story: Julio Alejandro
Adaptation: Julio Alejandro
Managing Director: Fernando Wagner
Production:  Ernesto Alonso

References 

1960 telenovelas
Mexican telenovelas
Televisa telenovelas
Television shows set in Mexico City
1960 Mexican television series debuts
1960 Mexican television series endings
Spanish-language telenovelas